Brus is a town and municipality in Serbia.

Brus may also refer to:

Places
 Coto Brus, a canton in the province of Puntarenas, Costa Rica
 Station Doyen Brus (Tram de Bordeaux), a tram station in Pessac, Bordeaux, France
 Brus Laguna, a municipality in Honduras
 Brus, Świętokrzyskie Voivodeship, south-central Poland
 Stary Brus, a village in Włodawa County, Lublin Voivodeship, eastern Poland
 Nowy Brus, a village in Stary Brus

Card games
 Brus (card game), a Danish card game
 Brús, an Icelandic card game
 Bruus, a North German card game, ancestral to the above

Other uses
 Brus (surname)
 Brös or brus, a fermented preparation of cheese and grappa from Piedmont
 Braenne brus, a green soda with pear taste, a product of Brænne Mineralvatn
 Brus equation, an equation in quantum electronics and nanotechnology
 The Brus, a 1370s Scots narrative poem by John Barbour

See also
 Bräus
 Bros (disambiguation)
 Bru (disambiguation)
 Bruce (disambiguation)
 Bruise
 Brush (disambiguation)
 Brussels (disambiguation)
 Bruus